Mumtaz Ahmed Khan (6 September 1935 – 28 Μay 2021) was an Indian humanitarian, educationist and social reformer known for founding the Al-Ameen Educational Society and its corresponding colleges.
Khan earned a MBBS degree from Madras University, Chennai, and became a general practitioner. In 1966, at the age of 31, he founded the Al-Ameen Educational Society.

Khan was a founder-trustee of an Urdu daily newspaper, the Salar Daily. He was also Pro Chancellor/ Treasurer of Aligarh Muslim University.

He chaired the Al-Ameen Educational Society, a post he took up in 2009 after Sadaqat Piran. He died on 27 May 2021 in Bengaluru.

Family
Khan was born to an advocate father, Yousuf Ismail Khan, and Sadat-un-Nissa Begum, a BA holder; both his parents being graduates from the Aligarh Muslim University. He had one sibling, his sister Naseem Firdous, who has had intellectual disability since birth.

He married Zarin Taj on 27 December 1964 in Bangalore in an arranged marriage set up by their families, who knew one another prior to the marriage.

His maternal grandfather was considerably well off. After inheriting from him, Khan moved to Bangalore from Tiruchirappalli, liquidating his assets as he set up a surgical practice in 1965.

Education
Khan did his MBBS at Madras University, Chennai in 1963. After getting married he continued his postgraduate studies, M.S. specializing in surgery at Stanley Medical College, Chennai.

Al Ameen Movement
At the age of 31, in 1966 Khan founded the Al-Ameen Movement. Al-Ameen movement is currently running 250+ educational institutions with more than 2.5 lakhs students across the country. Starting from Pre-Nursery School, it has all types of educational institutes including medical & engineering colleges. He had decided to name it The Bangalore Educational Society, but was advised against this by his friend Khader Hussein, who suggested Al-Ameen Educational Society as a reference to the title given to Prophet Muhammad and which meant The Trustworthy. Hussein later became the principal of Saboo Siddiq Polytechnic, Bombay.

Abbasiya Begum, a female member of the Karnataka Legislative Council, was elected the first chairperson of this society.

Institutions Run By Al-Ameen
Al-Ameen College of Pharmacy
Al-Ameen College of Law
Al-Ameen Arts, Science and Commerce Degree College
Al-Ameen College of Education
Al-Ameen Institute of Management Studies
Al-Ameen Institute of Information Sciences
Al-Ameen Pre University College
Al-Ameen Primary & High School
Al-Ameen Quest Academy
Founder of Al Ameen Medical  College Bijapur.

Accolades
Khan was awarded numerous accolades for his work. The Dr Mumtaz Ahmed Khan Best Teachers’ Awards are named after him.  The most important ones are:
AFMI|American Federation of Muslims from India (AFMI) Award
Kempegowda Award
Karnataka Rajyothsava Award (1990) for Education by Government of Karnataka
Junior Jaycees Award
Public Relations Society of India Award
All India Manufacturer's Organization (AIMO) Award
Federation of Senior Citizen Forums of Karnataka Award

References

External links

http://www.alameen66-edu.org
http://www.alameenlaw.com

Indian Muslims
1935 births
2021 deaths
Indian humanitarians
20th-century Indian medical doctors
20th-century Indian educational theorists
University of Madras alumni
Academic staff of Aligarh Muslim University
Scientists from Pune
Medical doctors from Maharashtra